The following table lists the largest man-made dams by volume of fill/structure. By general definition, a dam is a barrier that impounds water or underground streams, hence tailings dams are relegated to a separate list. Data on volume of structure is not as easily available or reliable as data on dam height and reservoir volume.

Type: TE - Earth; ER - Rock-fill; PG - Concrete gravity; CFRD - Concrete face rock fill.

List of largest tailings dams 

Type: TE - Earth; ER - Rock-fill; PG - Concrete gravity; CFRD - Concrete face rock fill.

See also 
 List of reservoirs by volume
 List of tallest dams
 List of conventional hydroelectric power stations
 List of largest hydroelectric power stations
 List of megaprojects#Dam and hydroelectric projects

References 

Dams
Dams
Dams

pt:Anexo:Lista de barragens#Em Volume da Albufeira